The Battle of Ganja or Elisavetpol (also Elizabethpol, Yelisavetpol, &c.) took place on 26 September 1826, during the Russo-Persian War of 1826-1828.

Crown prince and commander-in-chief Abbas Mirza had launched a successful campaign in the summer of 1826, which resulted in the recapture of many of the territories that were lost to the Russians by virtue of the Treaty of Gulistan (1813). Noticing the approach of the Iranian army, many of the locals that had recently come under formal Russian jurisdiction, quickly switched sides. Amongst the swiftly recaptured territories by the Iranians were the important cities of Baku, Lankaran and Quba.

Then Russian commander-in-chief in the Caucasus, Aleksey Yermolov, convinced that he had insufficient resources to battle the Iranians, ordered for the withdrawal from Elisavetpol (Ganja), which was thus retaken as well.

Yermolov's replacement, Ivan Paskevich, now with additional resources, started the counteroffensive. At Ganja, in late September 1826, the Iranian and Russian armies met, and Abbas Mirza and his men were defeated. As a result, the Iranian army was forced to retreat across the Aras river.

References

Sources
 
 

Ganja 1826
Battles involving Qajar Iran
Conflicts in 1826
19th century in Azerbaijan
1826 in the Russian Empire
Battles of the Russo-Persian Wars
1826 in Iran
History of Ganja, Azerbaijan
September 1826 events